The 2019 Fresno FC season is the club's second season in the United Soccer League Championship, the second tier of the American soccer pyramid.

Current squad

Competitions

Preseason friendlies

USL Championship

Western Conference Table

Results

USL Cup Playoffs

U.S. Open Cup

As a member of the USL Championship, the Fresno FC will enter the tournament in the Second Round, to be played May 14–15, 2019

References 

Fresno FC seasons
Fresno FC
Fresno FC
Fresno FC